Ly6/neurotoxin 1 is a protein in humans that is encoded by the LYNX1 gene. Alternatively spliced variants encoding different isoforms have been identified.

Function  

This gene encodes a member of the Ly-6/neurotoxin gene family, a group of lymphocyte antigens that attach to the cell surface by a glycosylphosphatidylinositol anchor and have a unique structure showing conserved 8-10 cysteine residues with a characteristic spacing pattern. Functional analysis indicates that this protein is not a ligand or neurotransmitter but has the capacity to enhance nicotinic acetylcholine receptor function in the presence of acetylcholine. This gene may also play a role in the pathogenesis of psoriasis vulgaris.

The LYNX1 gene codes for a protein (Lynx1) that binds to acetylcholine receptors in the brain. Lynx1 a member of the Ly6 superfamily of proteins that are capable of modulating neurotransmitter receptors.

Lynx1 and Visual Plasticity

Transgenic mice without Lynx1 expression do not have a normal critical period of neuroplasticity in the visual cortex for  development of ocular dominance columns. These mice show unusually rapid recovery from amblyopia in adulthood indicating a role in reduction of synaptic plasticity during the normal expression of Lynx1 in adult brain. 

Lynx1 reduces adult visual cortex plasticity by binding to nicotinic acetylcholine receptors (NAchR) and diminishing acetylcholine signaling. After the developmental critical period and into adulthood, both Lynx1 mRNA and protein levels increase in the adult V1 and the lateral geniculate nucleus (LGN). Lynx1 and nAChR mRNAs are co-expressed in the LGN, as well as in parvalbumin-positive GABAergic interneurons. After monocular deprivation during the critical period to induce amblyopia, Lynx1 knock-out rat models spontaneously recovered normal visual acuity by reopening the closed eye. Similarly, an infusion of physostigmine to increase acetylcholine signaling prompted recovery from amblyopia in wild type mice Inhibition of Lynx1 may be a possible therapeutic mechanism to prolong synaptic plasticity of the visual cortex and improve binocular function of some amblyopes.

See also 
Other Ly6 family proteins that are expressed in the brain: Lynx2, LYPD6, LYPD6B and PSCA.

References 

Genes on human chromosome 8